Dick Zornes (born June 15, 1944) is a former American football player, coach, and college athletics administrator. He was the head football coach at Eastern Washington University in Cheney from 1979 to 1993, compiling a  record. Zornes also served two stints as the athletic director at Eastern Washington, from 1990 to 1993 and again from 1997 to 1999. A native of Vancouver, Washington, he played college football at Eastern Washington—then Eastern Washington State College—from 1963 to 1966 as a safety and fullback for the Savages, then an NAIA program in the Evergreen Conference.

Zornes continued at his alma mater in 1967 as a student coach under Dave Holmes and moved with Holmes to the University of Hawaii in 1968. Zornes was later an assistant coach at  Montana College of Mineral Science and Technology—now known as Montana Technological University—in Butte and with the BC Lions of the Canadian Football League (CFL). He was hired as the head coach at Columbia Basin College, a junior college in Pasco, Washington, in 1977. In two seasons at Columbia Basin he tallied a mark of 17–3.

Head coaching record

College

References

1944 births
Living people
American football fullbacks
American football safeties
BC Lions coaches
Eastern Washington Eagles athletic directors
Eastern Washington Eagles football coaches
Eastern Washington Eagles football players
Hawaii Rainbow Warriors football coaches
Montana Tech Orediggers football coaches
Columbia Basin Hawks football coaches
Sportspeople from Vancouver, Washington
Players of American football from Washington (state)